Mats Johan Ersson Caap (born 23 October 1957) is a Swedish sailor. He competed in the Finn event at the 1988 Summer Olympics. He won the OK Dinghy world championships in 1987.

References

1957 births
Living people
Sportspeople from Norrköping
Swedish male sailors (sport)
Olympic sailors of Sweden
Sailors at the 1988 Summer Olympics – Finn
World champions in sailing for Sweden
OK class world champions
OK class sailors